Hải Dương station is a railway station in Vietnam. It serves the town of Hải Dương, in Hải Dương Province.

References

Buildings and structures in Hải Dương province
Railway stations in Vietnam